Tomasz Smoleń (born 3 February 1983 in Dębica) is a Polish former professional racing cyclist.

Major results

2005 
 2nd Overall Rhône-Alpes Isère Tour
1st Stage 4 
 3rd La Côte Picarde
 3rd Paris–Tours Espoirs
2009
 1st Stage 3 Szlakiem Grodów Piastowskich
 1st Stage 3 Tour of Małopolska
 2nd Road race, National Road Championships
2010
 1st Stage 6 Tour de Taiwan
 1st Stage 3 Tour of Małopolska
2011
 2nd Road race, National Road Championships
2012
 1st Memoriał Andrzeja Trochanowskiego
 1st Stage 5 Okolo Slovenska
 1st Stage 2 Okolo Jižních Čech
 2nd Road race, National Road Championships

References

External links

1983 births
Living people
Polish male cyclists
Sportspeople from Podkarpackie Voivodeship
People from Dębica